"Good Girls" is a song by Australian pop rock band 5 Seconds of Summer, taken from their 2014 self-titled debut album. The song was written by Michael Clifford, Ashton Irwin, Roy Stride, Josh Wilkinson, John Feldmann and Red Triangle's Rick Parkhouse and George Tizzard. The song was announced as the fourth single off their debut album on 7 October 2014.

Promotion
5 Seconds of Summer performed "Good Girls" on the Australian version of The X Factors live results show on last 6 October. They also performed "Good Girls" on The Ellen DeGeneres Show.

Music video
On 7 October 2014, the band started to tease the music video by direct messaging several fans on Twitter about the release date of the video. Then they tweeted the first teaser to fans who did not get the direct message on their Twitter account. On 8 October 2014, they tweeted the second teaser of the music video. The video was released on 10 October 2014.

Extended play
The extended play was released in 2014 which contains four tracks: "Good Girls - Single version", "Just Saying", "Long Way Home - Acoustic", and "Good Girls - Acoustic".

B-side
The B-side was released in 2016 which contains three tracks: "Just Saying", "Long Way Home - Acoustic", and "Good Girls - Acoustic".

Track listing

Personnel
Luke Hemmings – lead vocals, rhythm guitar
Michael Clifford – lead vocals, lead guitar
Calum Hood – lead vocals, bass guitar
Ashton Irwin – lead vocals, drums

Charts

Weekly charts

Year-end charts

Certifications

Release history

References

2014 singles
2014 songs
5 Seconds of Summer songs
Capitol Records singles
Song recordings produced by John Feldmann
Songs written by Ashton Irwin
Songs written by George Tizzard
Songs written by Michael Clifford (musician)
Songs written by Josh Wilkinson
Songs written by Rick Parkhouse
Songs written by Roy Stride